The  is a 16-bit color handheld game console manufactured by SNK. It is a successor to SNK's monochrome Neo Geo Pocket handheld which debuted in 1998 in Japan, with the Color being fully backward compatible. The Neo Geo Pocket Color was released on March 16, 1999 in Japan, August 6, 1999 in North America, and October 1, 1999 in Europe, entering markets all dominated by Nintendo, competing with Nintendo's Game Boy Color.

After a good sales start in both the U.S. and Japan with 14 launch titles (a record at the time), subsequent low retail support in the U.S., lack of communication with third-party developers by SNK's American management, the popularity of Nintendo's Pokémon franchise and anticipation of the 32-bit Game Boy Advance, and strong competition from Bandai's WonderSwan in Japan, led to a sales decline in both regions.

Meanwhile, SNK had been in financial trouble for at least a year; the company soon collapsed, and was purchased by American pachinko manufacturer Aruze in January 2000. However, Aruze did not support SNK's video game business enough, leading to SNK's original founder and several other employees to leave and form a new company, BrezzaSoft. Eventually on June 13, 2000, Aruze decided to quit the North American and European markets, marking the end of SNK's worldwide operations and the discontinuation of Neo Geo hardware and software there. The Neo Geo Pocket Color (and other SNK/Neo Geo products) did however, last until 2001 in Japan. It was SNK's last video game console, as the company went bankrupt on October 22, 2001.

Despite its financial failure, the Neo Geo Pocket Color has been regarded as an influential system. Many highly acclaimed games were released for the system, such as SNK vs. Capcom: The Match of the Millennium, King of Fighters R-2, and other quality arcade titles derived from SNK's MVS and AES. It also featured an arcade-style microswitched 'clicky stick' joystick, which was praised for its accuracy and being well-suited for fighting games. The system's display and 40-hour battery life were also well received.

History

U.S. release and marketing
The U.S. version of the Neo Geo Pocket Color had an exclusive launch on the website eToys in 1999. eToys also sold the initial launch titles in the plastic snap lock cases. The system debuted in the United States with six launch titles (twenty promised by end of year) and retail price of $69.95. Six different unit colors were available: Camouflage Blue, Carbon Black, Crystal White, Platinum Blue, Platinum Silver, and Stone Blue. In its first two months, the NGPC sold a successful 25,000 units.

Prior to SNK's acquisition by Aruze, the Neo Geo Pocket Color was being advertised on U.S. television and units were being sold nationwide at Wal-Mart, Best Buy, Toys "R" Us, and other major retail chains. For the Christmas Holiday season in 1999, SNK spent $4 million on television advertisements that aired on channels including MTV, Comedy Central, Cartoon Network and Nickelodeon.

By May 2000, the NGPC had a 2% market share in the U.S. handheld console market; although tiny compared to the Game Boy and Game Boy Color, it was enough to turn a profit for SNK USA.

NNGPC

On 21 October 1999, a redesigned, slimmer version called New Neo Geo Pocket Color was released in Japan, selling at ¥6800. It is 13% smaller than the original Neo Geo Pocket Color, with dimensions 125 x 73 x 27 mm, and also features improved sound output.

Post-Western discontinuation
In June 2000, Aruze (parent of SNK) decided to discontinue all SNK operations outside Japan. As a result, remaining stock was bought back by SNK for repackaging in Asia. SNK were recalling most of the back-stock of systems and games to be flashed and re-sold in Asia where the system would continue to be sold and supported. Some of the back-stock of American NGPC hardware and software began to resurface on the American and Asian markets in 2003. These units frequently appeared bundled with six games stripped of their cases and manuals. Two games often included, Faselei! and Last Blade were never previously released in United States, meaning that they have no U.S.-localized box or manual; however, these titles did receive a European release, incorporating an English translation.

Features
Closely modeled after its predecessor, the Neo Geo Pocket Color design sports two face buttons on the right hand side of the system, and an eight-direction microswitched digital D-pad on the left. It is horizontally designed like the Game Gear, as opposed to the Game Boy's vertical setup and the WonderSwan's hybrid of both. Upgraded from the Neo Geo Pocket, it has a color screen in the middle.

Similar to the Game Boy and its successors, the Game Boy Color and Game Boy Advance, the Neo Geo Pocket Color does not have a back-lit screen, and games can only be played in a well-lit area. Like the Game.com before it, the Neo Geo Pocket Color uses a CR2032 battery to retain backup memory and keep the clock active, as well as the usual AA batteries to power the system during usage. The Neo Geo Pocket Color has no regional lockout.

The system has an on-board language setting, and games display text in the language selected (provided the cartridge supports that language). Other settings include time and date, and the system can provide customized horoscopes when one's birth date is entered.

Cables for linking multiple systems were available, as well as a cable to connect the NGPC and the Dreamcast, as part of a partnership between SNK and Sega. Games that featured this option include King of Fighters R-2 (links with King of Fighters '99 Dream Match and King of Fighters Evolution); SNK vs. Capcom: Match of the Millennium (links with Capcom vs. SNK); SNK vs. Capcom: Card Fighters Clash (links with King of Fighters Evolution); SNK vs. Capcom: Card Fighters 2 Clash Expand Edition (links with Capcom vs SNK) and Cool Cool Jam (links with Cool Cool Toon).

Technical specifications

 CPUs: Toshiba TLCS-900/H core (16/32-bit CISC based on Z80), up to 6.144 MHz, Z80 at 3.072 MHz dedicated to sound
 RAM: 12 KB for 900/H, 4 KB for Z80 (shared with the 900/H), 4 KB of tilemap RAM, 8 KB of character RAM
 ROM: 64 KB BIOS
 Interfaces: SIO 1 channel 19200 bit/s, 5-pin serial port
 Resolution: 160x152 (256x256 virtual screen)
 DMA: 4 channels, integrated in TLCS-900/H core
Colors: 146 (or 20 in monochrome mode) on-screen out of 4096
 Palettes: 16 for sprites, 16 per scrolling plane, additional 8 sets of 8 colors each assigned to the 6 monochrome-mode palettes (2 for sprites, 2 per scrolling plane), backdrop, and window
Characters: 512 8x8 characters, transparency + 3 colors per character
 Sprites: 64 8x8 sprites, each can be placed behind, in-between, or above the scrolling planes, no arbitrary scanline limitation
 Scrolling: 2 scrolling planes, 32x32 tilemaps with 8x8 character tiles
Special effects: Character flipping, sprite chaining, sprite coordinate offsetting, windowing, color inversion
 Sound: T6W28 (enhanced SN76489 with 3 square-wave tone generators + 1 noise generator, stereo capability), dual 8-bit digital-to-analog converters
 Cartridges: Maximum 4 MB (32 Mbit) with 4 to 16 Mbit flash memory
 Batteries: 40 hours on two AA batteries, Lithium CR2032 battery for memory and clock

Game library

A total of 82 games were released for the Neo Geo Pocket Color. Most of the system's games were produced by SNK themselves, featuring well-received titles from franchises such as Fatal Fury, Metal Slug and The King of Fighters. Several large third-party developers also contributed to the system; the most well known of these is Sega's Sonic the Hedgehog Pocket Adventure, a title heavily based on Sonic the Hedgehog 2 that is often considered one of the greatest games produced for the system. Taito contributed a port of their successful arcade game Densha de Go! 2 and Puzzle Bobble Mini, also known as Bust-A-Move Pocket. Capcom worked in conjunction with SNK on several crossover games featuring their characters, including SNK vs. Capcom: Match of the Millennium and the SNK vs. Capcom: Card Fighters Clash series of games. Namco published a conversion of Pac-Man, which came with a plastic cross ring that restricted the system's clicky stick to four directions; this version is often seen as one of the best home ports of the game to be released. Compile, Data East and ADK also produced ports of Puyo Pop, Magical Drop and Crush Roller respectively. Success published Cotton: Fantastic Night Dreams, a successful port of the arcade game of the same name.

Similar to the Neo Geo AES console, Neo Geo Pocket Color games were packaged in large clamshell-like black cases, fitted with bright, colorful cover art on them. As a way to reduce costs, in North America the games were instead shipped in cardboard boxes, a move that has been negatively received due to their generally poor-quality. Japanese games were later released in the same cardboard boxes, while all European releases used the clamshell cases. Towards the end of the system's short lifespan in North America, games were often bundled together in blister packs and sold in stores to clear out inventory, often including previously-unreleased titles such as Faselei!.

Reception
SNK sold over 25,000 Neo Geo Pocket Color systems in Japan and over 100,000 in Europe by the end of 1999. By May of 2000, the Neo Geo Pocket Color retained a 2% market share in the North American handheld market; although minuscule compared to the Nintendo's Game Boy Color, it was enough to turn a profit for SNK America.

Retrospective feedback for the Neo Geo Pocket Color has been positive. USGamer writer Jeremy Parish considers it an important and influential handheld for being a "technological bridge" between the 8-bit portable era and the Game Boy Advance, and for its "clicky stick" having been used for modern video game consoles. He praised the game's small library for its quality and wide selection of genres, specifically titles such as SNK vs. Capcom: Card Fighters Clash, Sonic Pocket Adventure, Magical Drop and Pac-Man, and for the system's build quality being robust and well-built. Parish blamed the system's commercial failure on both SNK's large lack of retail presence and for Aruze acquiring the company in 2000, concluding the article with: "Neo Geo Pocket Color's life may have been painfully brief, but it was nevertheless memorable for those who experienced it. Perhaps all the more so for the system's brevity, in fact." Ryan Lamble of Den of Geek felt that the Neo Geo Pocket Color was the best rival to Nintendo's Game Boy Color for its "brilliant" game library, design and overall quality. Lamble expressed somber towards the system's early defeat in the handheld market, saying: "It was a premature end for a system that, although doomed to remain a distant second to the Game Boy, could have forged a great little niche of its own." NintendoLifes Damien McFerran said that both it and the WonderSwan served as some of the most "interesting challengers" towards Nintendo. He commended the system for its game library and clamshell boxes, hardware capabilities, battery life and lasting legacy on future systems, writing: "Like the WonderSwan, the Neo Geo Pocket Color may not have succeeded in its goal of wrestling market share away from Nintendo, but that doesn't automatically mean it was a failure. Many fans will argue that the quality of the software available was far in advance of that on the Game Boy Color, and the fantastic controls, amazing battery life, cool PDA features and excellent screen combine to make a system which is still hard to put down, even today."

See also
 List of Neo Geo Pocket Color games

Notes

References

1990s toys
2000s toys
Backward-compatible video game consoles
Sixth-generation video game consoles
Handheld game consoles
Discontinued handheld game consoles
Color
Products introduced in 1999
Products and services discontinued in 2001
Regionless game consoles